Thief of Hearts is a 1984 American drama film.

"Thief of Hearts" can also refer to:

Music
 "Thief of Hearts", a 1984 single by Melissa Manchester from the film
 "Thief of Hearts", a song by Madonna on the 1992 album Erotica
 "Thief of Hearts", a song by Bon Jovi on the 2004 album 100,000,000 Bon Jovi Fans Can't Be Wrong

Television
 Ladrón de corazones ("Thief of Hearts"), a 2003 American Spanish-language telenovela
 "Thief! (Of Hearts)", a 1987 episode of the American animated TV series The New Archies
 "Thief of Hearts", a 1994 episode of the American TV series Viper
 "Thief of Hearts", a 2005 episode of the American TV series The Inside

Other
 Thief of Hearts, a 1995 novel by Laurence Yep
 Thief of Hearts, a 2001 novel by MaryJanice Davidson
 Thief of Hearts, a horse that won the Prix de Condé in 1997